Natalia Mikhailovna Vodianova (born 28 February 1982), nicknamed Supernova, is a Russian supermodel, actress and United Nations Goodwill Ambassador.

In 2012, she came in third on  Forbes top-earning models list, estimated to have earned $8.6 million in one year. Vodianova was ranked in 2015 by models.com as one of the New Supers in the fashion industry.

In 2010, Vodianova was awarded Inspiration of the Year by Harper's Bazaar. In 2014, Glamour recognized her as Woman of the Year and awarded her its The Voice for Children award.

Vodianova is a mother of 5. She is also a member of the Special Olympics International Board of Directors. In 2021, the United Nations Population Fund (UNFPA) appointed her as a Goodwill Ambassador for the sexual and reproductive health agency.

Early life
Born in Gorky, in the Soviet Union (now Nizhny Novgorod, Russia), Vodianova grew up in a district of the city (Avtozavod, GAZ car factory) with her mother and two half-sisters. One of her grandmothers is Mordovian (Erzya).

Career

Modelling
At the age of 15, Vodianova enrolled in a modelling agency. By the age of 17, she had moved to Paris, and signed with Viva Models. Vodianova has achieved success as a runway, editorial, and advertising campaign model. She has walked in more than 200 runway shows for American and European-based designers' ready-to-wear and haute couture collections, and has completed advertising campaigns for various fashion houses.

She has worked with fashion photographers such as Mario Testino, Annie Leibovitz.

Vodianova has also appeared on the covers of major international magazines including Vanity Fair; Vogue, and Interview.

Photographed by Steven Meisel, Vodianova made her first appearance on the cover of American Vogue in the September 2004 edition alongside Gisele Bündchen and Daria Werbowy as one of the "Models of the Moment". She then appeared as the solo cover subject of the July 2007 edition of the magazine. During this time period, other covers of American Vogue have all featured non-model celebrities with only three other exceptions—Linda Evangelista, Liya Kebede, and Bündchen. In May 2009, Vodianova was again featured on the cover of American Vogue as one of the "Model Faces of the Moment". As of 2014, Vodianova has appeared on the cover of British Vogue ten times; the first was the September 2003 issue.

 In Spring 2009, Vodianova entered a three-year agreement to be a brand ambassador for the French lingerie company Etam and will design a lingerie collection each season during the term of the agreement. The collections will be marketed under the brand Natalia pour Etam. Vodianova has a contract with Guerlain, a French perfume house and cosmetics line, which was acquired in 1994 by the LVMH group, a multinational investment corporation specializing in luxury brands. She is also a regular campaign and poster model for Stella McCartney. She also featured as a 'Face of the Moment' in May 2009's US Vogue.

In 2014, Vodianova appeared on the cover of the September issue of Vanity Fair shot by photographer Mario Testino. She was one of fifty models on the September 2014 cover of Italian Vogue, the magazine's fiftieth-anniversary issue. She has also appeared on a solo cover for French Vogue in the September issue, her sixth cover for the magazine. In the November issue, Vodianova graced the cover of American Vogue shot by Annie Leibovitz; this was her fourth American Vogue cover and second solo American Vogue cover since her appearance in July 2007.

In 2015, Vodianova was photographed by Steven Meisel for the 2015 Pirelli Calendar; this was her fourth appearance in Pirelli since 2003. She returned as the face of Calvin Klein's Euphoria fragrance shot by Inez and Vinoodh, ten years since her first exclusive contract with Calvin Klein. Vice President of Calvin Klein Fragrances, Coty Inc, Friedemann Schmid, commenting on her return to the brand, said "Natalia Vodianova truly embodies the sensual glamour and sophistication of the Euphoria woman". Vodianova returned for the Stella McCartney campaign for the spring/summer 2015 and fall/winter 2015 collections. She ranked No. 5 on the 2015 Forbes list of highest earning models, earning an estimated $7 million.

In 2016, Vodianova was selected and photographed by Annie Leibovitz as part of the 43rd Pirelli Calendar, which celebrated some of the world's most inspiring women, such as Tavi Gevinson, Serena Williams, Amy Schumer, Yoko Ono, Fran Lebowitz, Patti Smith, Kathleen Kennedy, Yao Chen, Mellody Hobson, Ava DuVernay, Agnes Gund, and Shirin Neshat. This was her fifth appearance in Pirelli. She also fronted Riccardo Tisci's Givenchy 2016 Spring/Summer campaign along with Tisci's longtime muse Mariacarla Boscono. Other veteran models in the campaign included Lara Stone, Joan Smalls, Miranda Kerr, Gemma Ward, Iselin Steiro, Candice Swanepoel. This was Vodianova's fourth appearance in Tisci's Givenchy campaigns. Shot by Steven Meisel, she became the campaign model for Prada's spring/summer 2016 collection along with their comeback muse Sasha Pivovarova and Dutch newcomer Yasmin Wijnaldum. Vodianova appeared in her ninth ad campaign for Stella McCartney in their spring/summer 2016 collection together with Boscono. She also returned as the campaign model for Italian denim wear brand Miss Sixty. In October 2016, she appeared in her second campaign ad for David Yurman, which was shot by Bruce Weber for the fall/winter 2016 campaign.

In 2017, Vodianova was again in the Campaign Ad for David Yurman along with model Taylor Marie Hill for the spring/summer collection. Vodianova was also hired by H&M for their Conscious Exclusive collection, a sustainable line using recycled and organic materials.  Vodianova appeared in her 5th cover for W Magazine in their June/July 2017 edition, which was dedicated to Vodianova and photographed by Steven Meisel.

Vodianova was ranked 14th in British television channel Five's 2005 television programme World's Greatest Supermodel. Forbes magazine estimates she earned US$4.5 million between August 2006 and July 2007, US$4.8 million between May 2007 and April 2008 and US$5.5 million between June 2008 and June 2009, making her the seventh highest earning model worldwide during all three time periods.

Acting 
She was cast as Medusa in the 2010 film Clash of the Titans. In addition, she played major roles in the films CQ (2001), Probka (2009), and a 2012 film adaptation of Belle du Seigneur. She also served as the narrator in a major broadcast of Swan Lake from the Mariinsky Theatre (2013).

Other work
In May 2009, Vodianova co-hosted the semi-finals of the Eurovision Song Contest in Moscow. On 12 December 2009, she was designated an ambassador of the 2014 Winter Olympics in Sochi. In 2010, she appeared at the 2010 Winter Olympics closing ceremony in Vancouver.

Philanthropy
Vodianova is a founder of the Naked Heart Foundation, a philanthropic organisation that strives to provide a safe and inspiring environment in which to play for every child living in urban Russia and to help support families raising children with disabilities. Natalia's sister Oksana lives with autism. Vodianova drew attention to the problem of the rights of disabled people in Russia when her sister was asked to leave a cafe in Nizhny Novgorod because "she scares customers". 

She was inspired to found the charity after the Beslan tragedy. Vodianova's idea was to distract children who survived with play from their psychological trauma. The organisation built its first play park in 2006 in Nizhny Novgorod. It has since built nearly many more including one in Beslan.

Vodianova also lends her support to a number of philanthropic causes, such as the (Bugaboo)RED campaign, an initiative to help eliminate AIDS in Africa. That same year, Vodianova became an ambassador for Hear the World, a global campaign that seeks to raise awareness of the topic of hearing and hearing loss and to promote good hearing all over the world.

She is a spokesperson for the Tiger Trade Campaign, an alliance of 38 organisations "to bring back wild tigers by stopping trade in tiger parts and products from all sources." In an interview supporting the campaign, Vodianova said: "I'm proud that Russia, my country, is home to the most magnicifent of animals, the wild Siberian tiger. Today it is up to us to protect the tiger and its home, fewer than 350 Siberian tigers remain in the wild and no more than 3,400 tigers survive anywhere in the world. Unless we act now we will see the extinction of the wild tiger within our lifetime."

In 2015, together with Timon Afinsky, Vodianova co-founded the digital app Elbi, which allows people to donate money with a "Love Button", create content, send messages, and vote for charitable purposes. The app was promoted by the Clinton Global Initiative Commitment in 2016 and supported by Joanna Shields, Bebo co-founder Michael Birch, Wikipedia founder Jimmy Wales, Huffington Post co-founder Arianna Huffington, Mind Candy founder Acton Smith, designer Diane von Furstenberg, co-founder of Lastminute.com and Made.com Brent Hoberman, as well as the founder and CEO of Illumination Entertainment, Chris Meledandri.

Other projects

Special Olympics
Vodianova is a member of the international board of directors for the Special Olympics and supported the 2014 European Games and the 2015 World Games.

United Nations Population Fund (UNFPA) Goodwill Ambassador

In February 2021, the United Nations Population Fund (UNFPA) appointed Vodianova as a goodwill ambassador. Referencing her prior work with UNFPA's "Let's Talk" series, fighting shame, exclusion and discrimination, faced routinely by millions of women and girls, the agency said it hoped their partnerships would bridge the divide between the fashion and technology industries.

Awards
In November 2010, Harper's Bazaar awarded Vodianova with the Inspiration of the Year Award, given in recognition of her philanthropic efforts.

In April 2013, she was honoured with the Inspiration Award at the fourth annual DVF Awards. The award is given to women "who have demonstrated leadership, strength and courage in the face of adversity, and who use their influence to effect positive change." The same year, she was also the recipient of Harper's Bazaar's Philanthropist of the Year Award.

On 10 November 2014, Vodianova was one of the honored 2014 Glamour Woman of the Year for her contribution and philanthropy as The Voice for Children. The ceremony was held at Carnegie Hall, with Arianna Huffington presenting the award to Vodianova.

Personal life
Vodianova met Justin Portman ( 1969), half-brother of the 10th Viscount Portman and son of Edward Portman, 9th Viscount Portman, a British property heir, at a Paris dinner in 2001. They married in November 2001 when she was 8 months pregnant. In September 2002, over nine months after registering the marriage in the UK, they had a wedding ceremony in St. Petersburg, where Vodianova wore a dress designed by Tom Ford. They have three children: son Lucas Alexander (born 2001), daughter Neva (born 2006), and son Viktor (born 2007). Neva is named after the Russian river of the same name. Vodianova and Portman announced their separation in June 2011.

Following her separation from Portman, Vodianova began a relationship with Antoine Arnault, son of LVMH founder Bernard Arnault and the CEO of luxury brand Berluti. The couple has two sons: Maxim (born 2014) and Roman (born 2016). Vodianova announced their engagement on 31 December 2019. The COVID-19 pandemic forced the cancellation of their 27 June 2020 wedding at Saint-Pierre d'Hautvillers Abbey, and the couple officially married on 21 June 2020 at a Paris registry office. The couple have an apartment in Paris.

Notes

References

External links

 
 
 

 

1982 births
Living people
Russian female models
Russian emigrants to the United Kingdom
Actors from Nizhny Novgorod
Russian philanthropists
Russian film actresses
Russian emigrants to France
Russian Orthodox Christians from Russia
Portman family
Mordvin people
Russian activists against the 2022 Russian invasion of Ukraine